Arthur Ollman (born March 6, 1947) is an American photographer, author, curator, professor emeritus (San Diego State University (2006—2019), and founding director of The Museum of Photographic Arts, San Diego. He served as MoPA director from 1983 to 2006, and as director of the School of Art, Design and Art History, SDSU, from 2006 to 2011. He was president of the board of directors for the Foundation for the Exhibition of Photography (2015—2019) and has authored and contributed to more than twenty-five books and catalogs.

Early life and education
Arthur Ollman was born in Milwaukee in 1947, the grandson of Jewish immigrants from Ukraine. He studied art history at the University of Wisconsin, Madison (1965—1969). After graduating with a BA, Ollman purchased fifty-three acres of forestland in Bucksport, Maine, and started a commune while pursuing an interest in photography. He left Maine in 1974 to attend San Francisco Art Institute, and in 1975, the MFA program at Lone Mountain College (now part of University of San Francisco). There he expanded on photographing at night with long exposures, switching from black and white to color.

Career

The first museum to purchase Ollman’s images was The Museum of Modern Art, in 1977.  He went on to exhibit in one-person and group exhibitions at Whitney Museum of American Art, Centre Georges Pompidou, San Francisco Museum of Modern Art, and Los Angeles County Museum of Art. His work is in many international museum collections.

Ollman was one of the founding members of the board of directors for San Francisco Camerawork and served as chairman of the board from 1979 to 1983. There he curated exhibitions of many well-known figures in contemporary photography. In 1976, he created The Photo History Video Project, producing oral historical video interviews with older Western photographers who had not yet been well researched. These included Laura Gilpin, Pirkle Jones and Ruth-Marion Baruch, Jack Welpott, Ruth Bernhard, Walter Chappell, and Edmund Teske.

In 1979, Ollman was introduced to Ansel Adams, and the following year Adams asked Ollman to teach at his Ansel Adams Yosemite Workshop. For the next three summers, Ollman taught alongside Adams and some of the most prominent photographers of the day, including Roy DeCarava, Olivia Parker, Marie Cosindas, David Kennerly, and Arnold Newman.

In 1983, Ansel Adams recommended Ollman for the position of founding director of The Museum of Photographic Arts slated for San Diego’s Balboa Park. Ollman was hired in November 1982, and the museum opened in May 1983. He served as director for twenty-three years, overseeing two capital expansion projects, development of a permanent collection numbering over 7,000 objects by 2006, and a research library of more than twenty-five thousand books and ephemera.

Ollman curated more than seventy-five exhibitions, many worldwide, including photographers of the time, such as Manuel Alvarez Bravo, Roy DeCarava, Arnold Newman, Harry Callahan, William Klein, Ruth Bernhard, Eikoh Hosoe, Graciela Iturbide, Flor Garduño, Robert Heinecken, Lee Friedlander, Garry Winogrand, James Nachtwey, Sebastiao Salgado, Susan Meiselas, Duane Michals, and Bill Brandt. He also organized exhibitions of historical figures, William Henry Fox Talbot, Samuel Bourne, Carleton Watkins, F. Holland Day, Edweard Muybridge, Alfred Stieglitz, Dorothea Lange, and Roman Vishniac.

Upon leaving the Museum of Photographic Arts in 2006, Ollman was hired as Director of the School of Art, Design, and Art History at San Diego State University, overseeing university policies, seven staff and 101 full and part-time faculty; 1,200 majors and nearly 10,000 students per year in art, design, and/or art history classes, and an MFA program with approximately 30 candidates per year.

Under his leadership and fundraising the university opened its San Diego State University Downtown Gallery. In 2011, Ollman left that position and reverted to full-time teaching. He taught both color and black and white studio classes, history of photography, and museum studies. In 2019, Ollman retired and was awarded professor emeritus status.

In 2014, Ollman joined the board of The Foundation for the Exhibition of Photography “FEP” based in Lausanne, Switzerland; Paris, France; and Minneapolis, USA. In 2016 he curated FEP’s retrospective exhibition of the Brazilian contemporary artist, Vik Muniz, which has been seen in six international venues. In 2018, he co-curated Hard Truths with David Furst of The New York Times, an exhibition of five of the finest photojournalists working for the Times, which has traveled to five venues in Europe.

Ollman has taught photography for The Fred Roberts Photography Workshops (2015-2019), in Bhutan, Kyrgyzstan, Tajikistan, India, Portugal, Mozambique, Mexico, Canada, and the U.S.

Personal life
Ollman has two children.

Awards
 National Endowment for the Arts Grantee
 California Arts Council
 National Endowment for the Arts, Fellow

Publications
 Samuel Bourne: Images of India, Friends of Photography, Carmel, CA, 1983
 Situational Photographs, Catalogue Introduction, San Diego State University, 1984
 Victor Landweber, exhibition catalogue introduction, Museum of Photographic Arts, San Diego, CA, 1985
 Max Yavno: Poetry and Clarity, exhibition catalogue introduction, Museum of Photographic Arts, San Diego, CA, 1986
 Rosalind Solomon: Earth Rites,  exhibition catalogue introduction, Museum of Photographic Arts, San Diego, CA 1986
 Arnold Newman: Five Decades, exhibition catalogue introduction, Harcourt, Brace, Jovanovich, San Diego, CA, 1986
 William Klein: An American in Paris, exhibition catalog introduction, Museum of Photographic Arts, San Diego, CA, 1987
 Parallels And Contrasts: Photographs from The Stephen White Collection; Chapter on Landscape and Architecture. Stephen White editions, 1988
 Rosalind Solomon: Photographs 1976-1987, Etherton Gallery, Tucson, AZ, catalogue introduction
 Revalaciones: The Art of Manuel Alvarez Bravo, exhibition catalogue introduction, Museum of Photographic Arts, San Diego, CA, 1990
 Other Visions/Other Realities: Mexican Photography Since 1930, Rice University Press, 1990
 Arnold Newman: Five Decades, Japanese exhibition catalogue introduction, Pacific Press Service, Tokyo, Japan, 1992
 Persona, exhibition catalogue, Museum of Photographic Arts, 1992
 Fata Morgana USA: The American Way of Life/Photomontages by Josep Renau, exhibition catalogue introduction, Museum of Photographic Arts and Instituto Valenciana Arte Moderno, Valencia, Spain, 1992
 Seduced By Life: The Art of Lou Stoumen, exhibition catalogue, introduction and essay, Museum of Photographic Arts, 1992
 Retratos Y Sueños/Portraits And Dreams: Wendy Ewald’s Photographs by Mexican Children, introduction essay of exhibition catalogue, Poloroid Corporation and Curatorial Assistance, 1993
 Portrait Of Nepal: Kevin Bubriski, introduction essay, Chronicle Books, 1993
 Horace Bristol, catalog essay, Centre de Photographie de Lectoure, France, 1995
 Points Of Entry: A Nation of Strangers, Museum of Photographic Arts, 1995
 Exhibiting Photography: Twenty Years at the Center for Creative Photography, Book essay, Center for Creative Photography, University of Arizona, Tucson, Arizona, 1996
 Kenro Izu, introductory essay, 1998
 Fragments of Document and Memory: Catalog of the 3rd International Photo-Biennale, Tokyo Metropolitan Museum of Photography, 2 essays, 1999
 The Beauty Of Darkness; Photographs by Connie Imboden, 1999
 The Model Wife, Bulfinch Press, 1999
 100 al 2000: il Secolo della Fotoarte, Photology, Milano, essay, 2000
 Phillip Scholz Ritterman: Navigating by Light, MoPA, 2001
 Double Vision: Photographs From The Strauss Collection; Essay, University Art Museum, California State University, Long Beach, CA, 2001
 Visions of Passage: Artists, Writers and the American Scene, 2002 introduction essay, Arena Press
 First Photographs: William Henry Fox Talbot and the Birth of Photography, Museum of Photographic Arts, 2002
 Subway: Bruce Davidson, introduction to the second edition, 2003, St. Ann’s Press
 Recollections: Three Decades of Photographs; John Sexton, Forward to book, 2006, Ventana Editions, Carmel Valley, Ca.
 Piezas Selectas: Fotografias de la Coleccion del IVAM, Essay for book, Coleccionado Fotografias O El Significado De Todo, 2006, Generalitat Valenciana, Valencia, Spain
 Walking Through The World: Sandi Haber Fifield, Introduction to book, 2009, Edizioni Charta, Milano
 Arnold Newman: Master Class, book essay, 2011, Thames and Hudson, London, New York 
 Dorothy Kerper-Munnely, Monograph, 2015, Introduction essay
 Vik Muniz, book, 2016, Delmonico-Prestel, New York

References 

1947 births
Living people
University of Wisconsin–Madison College of Letters and Science alumni
Photography curators
Directors of museums in the United States
American portrait photographers
American art historians
Place of birth missing (living people)
San Diego State University faculty
American people of Ukrainian-Jewish descent